Jackson Volney Scholz (March 15, 1897 – October 26, 1986) was an American sprint runner. In the 1920s, he became the first person to appear in an Olympic sprint final in three different Olympic Games. After his athletic career, he also gained fame as a writer.

Born to Susan and Zachary Scholz in Buchanan, Michigan, Jackson Scholz, nicknamed "The New York Thunderbolt", competed for the University of Missouri in Columbia, Missouri (where he joined Kappa Alpha Order), and later the New York Athletic Club. While quite successful in the Olympics, he won only a single national title, the 220 yards AAU title in 1925.

His first Olympic appearance was in Antwerp in 1920, where he won a gold medal with the American 4 × 100 m relay team. Individually he placed fourth in the 100 m. Later that year, Scholz equaled the World Record in the 100 m, running 10.6 s in Stockholm.

Four years later, he was one of the favorites for the sprint titles in the 100 and 200 m. He lived up to the expectations in the 200 m, but was beaten to the gold in the 100 m by Britain's Harold Abrahams. The 100 m race, and the 400 m race won by Eric Liddell, are depicted in the movie Chariots of Fire, which was released in 1981 – five years before Scholz's death at the age of 89. He was played in the film by actor Brad Davis.

Scholz made a third Olympic appearance in 1928. As the reigning champion, he placed fourth in the 200 m.

During the 1984 Summer Olympic Games, an American Express credit card commercial ("Don't leave home without it") included Ben Cross and the 87-year-old Scholz. When Cross—who portrayed Abrahams in the film Chariots of Fire—said something about beating Scholz, the latter remarked, "You didn't beat me!" with mock indignation. Proving he was "still pretty fast," Scholz beat Cross to the draw in picking up the tab with his credit card.

References

External links 

 
 
 
 
 Some books written by Jackson Volney Scholz

1897 births
1986 deaths
American male sprinters
Athletes (track and field) at the 1920 Summer Olympics
Athletes (track and field) at the 1924 Summer Olympics
Athletes (track and field) at the 1928 Summer Olympics
Track and field athletes from Michigan
Olympic gold medalists for the United States in track and field
Olympic silver medalists for the United States in track and field
University of Missouri alumni
Medalists at the 1924 Summer Olympics
Medalists at the 1920 Summer Olympics
People from Buchanan, Michigan